Anaswara Rajan (born 8 September 2002) is an Indian actress who works mainly in Malayalam films. She made her acting debut in the Malayalam short film Globe. Her first feature film was  Udaharanam Sujatha (2017). Anaswara gained popularity through the commercially successful Malayalam films Thanneer Mathan Dinangal (2019) and Super Sharanya (2022).

Early life
Anaswara was born on 8 September 2002 to Rajan and Usha, natives of Karivellur, Kannur. She was educated at St. Mary's Girls High School, Payyanur.

Acting career
Anaswara made her film acting debut with Udaharanam Sujatha in 2017, as Athira Krishnan, the rebellious daughter of Sujatha Krishnan. After playing brief roles in few other films, Anaswara played her first leading role in the 2019 film Thanneer Mathan Dinangal. Anaswara made her entry into Tamil film industry with the Trisha starrer Raangi released in 2022.

Filmography

Films 
All films are in Malayalam language unless otherwise noted.

Short films

Television

Notes

References

External links
 
 

People from Kannur district
Actresses in Malayalam cinema
Child actresses in Malayalam cinema
Living people
21st-century Indian child actresses
Indian film actresses
Actresses from Kerala
2002 births
Actresses in Tamil cinema